Nathan Lopes Cardozo (born 1946) is a Dutch-born Israeli rabbi and Jewish philosopher, founder of the David Cardozo Academy in Jerusalem.

Biography
Nathan Lopes Cardozo was born in Amsterdam and  named after his father's youngest brother who was killed in the Holocaust. His father was a secular Jew who was proud of his Portuguese Jewish origin. His mother was an orphan. When her Christian parents died, she was raised by Jewish family members and became part of the community and spoke their language. During the Holocaust, she saved her husband and his family by hiding them in her apartment in the center of Amsterdam while it was under Nazi occupation. Many times she risked her life by telling the Nazis that her husband and family were already taken to the concentration camps.

Due to his birth to a non-Jewish mother Cardozo was technically not halakhically Jewish  (natural-born Jewish status is conferred through one’s mother), but at age sixteen he formally converted to Judaism through the Amsterdam Rabbinate, formed by Hacham Salomon Rodrigues Pereira, Chief Rabbi Aron Schuster and Rabbi Benjamin Pels. His mother later converted to Judaism as well.

Cardozo spent the next 12 years studying at various Haredi Yeshivas such as Gateshead Talmudical College. He received his semikhah from Rabbi Aryeh Leib Gurwitz, Rosh yeshiva of Gateshead. He later received his Doctorate in Philosophy from Columbia Pacific University.

At the age of 21, he married Freyda Gnesin, a woman of Eastern European descent whom he met in the synagogue of Haarlem.

After his mother's conversion to Judaism, Cardozo changed his name from Nathan the son of Abraham (being the standard name for someone not born Jewish) to Nathan son of Jacob.

Cardozo has five children and lives in the Bayit V'Gan neighborhood of Jerusalem.

Rabbinic career
Cardozo is the Founder and Dean of the David Cardozo Academy and the Bet Midrash of Avraham Avinu in Jerusalem. The academy is named for his great-great-grandfather, Rabbi David Cardozo, who was Chief Rabbi of Amsterdam's Portuguese-Spanish Synagogue. Cardozo is the author of 13 books and numerous articles in both English and Hebrew. He heads a Think Tank focused on finding new Halachic and philosophical approaches to dealing with the crisis of religion and identity amongst Jews and the Jewish State of Israel.

Some Orthodox Jews claim that Cardozo's opinions on the tenets of Judaism  veer from conventional Orthodox thought and custom. Rabbi Avrohom Gordimer, a rabbinic coordinator for the Orthodox Union, said that Cardozo  has "accepted the approach of the Conservative movement, which postulates that Halacha is not objective divine truth, is not fixed, and that it must change in accordance with the values of the times and with various needs."

Cardozo's ideas are debated social media, blogs, books and other forums.
Cardozo maintains that his views remain within the acceptable realm of Orthodoxy and on numerous occasions distanced them from the Reform & Conservative movements.Cardozo believes that the biblical prohibition against two men engaging in homosexual acts only applies to those who are purely heterosexual.

Books 
 Thoughts to Ponder: Daring Observations About the Jewish Tradition
 The Torah as God's Mind
 Judaism on Trial: An Unconventional Discussion about Jews, Judaism and the State of Israel 
 The Infinite Chain
Between Silence and Speech
 Crisis, Covenant and Creativity: Jewish Thoughts for a Complex World
 For the Love of Israel and the Jewish People: Essays and Studies on Israel, Jews and Judaism
 The Tent of Avraham: Gleanings from the David Cardozo Academy
 The Written and Oral Torah.

In 2016, Cardozo wrote an Introduction to the Nehalel Siddur, and a foreword for A Damaged Mirror: A story of memory and redemption. His autobiography, Lonely But Not Alone,  was released in late 2016.A film bearing the same name, Lonely But Not Alone,  was made about his life.

References

1946 births
Living people
Israeli Orthodox rabbis
Jewish Dutch writers
Dutch emigrants to Israel
Dutch Sephardi Jews
Dutch people of Portuguese-Jewish descent
Israeli people of Portuguese-Jewish descent
Writers from Amsterdam
Dutch Orthodox rabbis